Skouriotissa is a village in the Nicosia District of Cyprus and the site of the former Skourotissa mines. Today the area is largely uninhabited with only 8 people remaining in the village.

As of 2011 the village houses the headquarters of Sector 1 of the UNFICYP mission. The headquarters are currently assigned to an infantry unit from Argentina who is lead nation in Sector 1.

References

Communities in Nicosia District